Dego may refer to:

People
 Baruch Dego (born 1982), Ethiopian-born Israeli football player
 David Dego (born 2001), Israeli football player
 Messay Dego (born 1986), Ethiopian-born Israeli football player

Places
 Dego, Liguria, Italy

Other
 French ship Dégo (1798)